In chemistry, hyponitrite may refer to the anion  ([ON=NO]2−), or to any ionic compound that contains it.  In organic chemistry, it may also refer to the group −O−N=N−O−, or any organic compound with the generic formula R1−O−N=N−O−R2, where R1 and R2 are organic groups.  Such compounds can be viewed as salts and esters of respectively hyponitrous acid  or HON=NOH.

An acid hyponitrite is an ionic compound with the anion  ([HON=NO]−).

Hyponitrite ion
Hyponitrite exhibits cis–trans isomerism.

The trans (E) form is generally found in hyponitrite salts such as sodium hyponitrite and silver(I) hyponitrite.

The cis (Z) form of sodium hyponitrite can be obtained too, and it is more reactive than the trans form.  The cis hyponitrite anion is nearly planar and almost symmetric, with lengths of about 140 pm for N−O bond and 120 pm for the N−N bond, and O−N−N angles of about 119°.

Reactions
The hyponitrite ions can act as a bidentate ligand in either bridging or chelating mode. There is a bridging cis-hyponitrite group in the red dinuclear form of nitrosyl pentammine cobalt(III) chloride, [Co(NH3)5NO]Cl2.

Hyponitrite can act as a reducing agent for example reducing iodine:
 + 3  + 3  →  +  + 6 HI

Hyponitrite esters
Organic trans-hyponitrites R1−O−N=N−O−R2 can be obtained by reacting trans silver(I) hyponitrite  with various alkyl halides.  For example, reaction with t-butyl chloride yields trans di-tert-butyl hyponitrite.

Other alkyl radicals reported in the literature include ethyl, and benzyl.  These compounds can be a source of alkoxyl radicals.

See also
Other nitrogen oxyanions include

nitrate, 
nitrite, 
peroxonitrite, (peroxynitrite), OONO−
peroxonitrate, 
trioxodinitrate, (hyponitrate), [ON=NO2]2−
nitroxylate, [O2N−NO2]4−
orthonitrate, 
dinitramide, [O2N−N−NO2]−
nitrosyl hyponitrite, [ONNONO]−

References

Oxyanions
Nitrogen–oxygen compounds